Joanna Southcott (or Southcote; April 1750 – 26 December 1814) was a self-described  religious prophetess from Devon, England. A "Southcottian" movement continued in various forms after her death; its eighth prophet, Mabel Barltrop, died in 1934.

Early life
Joanna Southcott was born in the hamlet of Taleford, Devonshire, baptised at Ottery St Mary, and raised in the village of Gittisham. Her father, William Southcott (died 1802), ran a small farm. She did dairy work as a girl, and after the death of her mother, Hannah, she went into service, first as a shop-girl in Honiton, then for a considerable time as a domestic servant in Exeter. She was eventually dismissed because a footman whose attentions she rejected claimed that she was "growing mad".

Self-revelation
Originally in the Church of England, she joined the Wesleyans in Exeter in about 1792. She became persuaded that she had supernatural gifts and wrote and dictated prophecies in rhyme. She then announced herself as the Woman of the Apocalypse, spoken of in a prophetic passage of the Revelation (12:1–6).

Southcott came to London at the request of William Sharp, an engraver, and began selling paper "seals of the Lord" at prices varying from twelve shillings to a guinea. The seals were supposed to ensure a holder's place among the 144,000 people ostensibly elected to eternal life.

The new Messiah and death
At the age of 64, Southcott claimed she was pregnant with the new Messiah, the Shiloh of Genesis (49:10). 19 October 1814 was the planned delivery date, but Shiloh failed to appear, and it was given out that she was in a trance. Southcott had a disorder that made her appear pregnant and this fuelled her followers, who numbered about 100,000 by 1814, mainly in the London area.

Southcott died not long after this. Her official date of death was given as 27 December 1814, but it is likely that she died the previous day, as her followers retained her body for some time in the belief that she would be raised from the dead. They agreed to her burial only after the corpse began to decay. She was buried at the Chapel of Ease at St John's Wood in January 1815.

Legacy
The "Southcottian" movement did not end with her death in 1814, although her followers had declined greatly in number by the end of that century. In 1844 one Ann Essam left large sums of money for "printing, publishing and propagation of the sacred writings of Joanna Southcott". The will was disputed in 1861 by her niece on grounds which included that the writings were blasphemous and the bequest was contrary to the Statutes of Mortmain: the Court of Chancery refused to find the writings blasphemous but voided the bequest, acknowledging that it broke the Statutes of Mortmain.

In 1881 there was an enclave of her followers living in the Chatham area, east of London, who were distinguished by their long beards and good manners.

Southcott left a sealed wooden casket of prophecies, usually known as Joanna Southcott's Box, with instructions to open it only at a time of national crisis and in the presence of all 24 current bishops of the Church of England, who were to spend a fixed period beforehand studying her prophecies. Attempts were made to persuade the episcopate to open it in the Crimean War and again in the First World War. In 1927, the psychic researcher Harry Price claimed to have come into possession of the box and arranged to have it opened in the presence of one reluctant prelate, the suffragan Bishop of Grantham. It was found to contain only a few oddments and unimportant papers, among them a lottery ticket and a horse-pistol. Price's claims to have had the true box were disputed by historians and by Southcott followers.

Southcottians who denied the authenticity of the box opened in 1927 continued to press for the true box to be opened. A campaign on billboards and in national newspapers such as the Sunday Express was run in the 1960s and 1970s by a prominent group of Southcottians, the Panacea Society in Bedford (formed in 1920), to try to persuade the 24 bishops to have the box opened, claiming: "War, disease, crime and banditry, distress of nations and perplexity will increase until the Bishops open Joanna Southcott's box." The Society claims to hold this true box at a secret location for safekeeping, with its whereabouts to be disclosed only when a bishops' meeting has been arranged. Southcott prophesied that the Day of Judgement would come in the year 2004, and her followers stated that if the contents of the box had not been studied beforehand, the world would have had to meet it unprepared.

Charles Dickens refers to Southcott in a description of the year 1775 at the beginning of A Tale of Two Cities.

Her religious teaching is still practised today by two groups: the Christian Israelite Church and the House of David.

Works
Among her 60 publications may be mentioned:

The Book of Wonders (1813–1814)
Prophecies announcing the birth of the Prince of Peace, extracted from the works of Joanna Southcott to which are added a few remarks thereon, made by herself, ed. Ann Underwood. London: 1814
Joanna Southcott: A dispute between the woman and the powers of darkness (1802) New York; Woodstock: Poole 1995. . Facsimile

See also
John Ward (1781–1837), a self-styled prophet who claimed to be Southcott's successor
Alice Seymour – another 20th-century follower of Southcott

Notes

References

Richard Reece M. D.: A letter from Joanna Southcott to Dr. Richard Reece containing a circumstantial exposition of her present situation, as given by nine medical gentlemen..., six of whom have pronounced her pregnant with her permission to Dr. Reece, in case of her death before the birth of the child, to open her body, to find out the cause which has produced such singular effects in a woman of her age. London, 1814
Richard Reece M. D.: A Complete Refutation of the statements and remarks published by Dr. Reece relative to Mrs. Southcott ... By an impartial observer. London, 1815
Richard Reece M. D.: A correct statement of the circumstances that attended the last illness and death of Mrs. Southcott with an account of the appearances exhibited on dissection and the artifices that were employed to deceive her medical attendants. London 1815
Library of Biography. Remarkable Women of different Nations and Ages. First Series. Boston. John P. Jewett and Co., 1858
Richard Pearse Chope: Life of Joanna Southcott. Bibliography of Joanna Southcott by Charles Lane, communicated by R. Pearse Chope read at Exeter, 25 July 1912. Reprinted from the Transactions of the Devonshire Association for the Advancement of Science, Literature and Art. 1912.
The trial of Joanna Southcott during seven days, which commenced on the fifth, and ended on the eleventh of December 1804 at the Neckinger House, Bermondsey, London. Plymouth, England: Jas. H. Keys, 1916
Rachel J. Fox: The truth about Joanna Southcott (prophetess), the great box of sealed writings, together with a challenge to the bishops to support her writings, by a Member of the Church of England. Bedford: Swann & Cave, 1921
Rachel J. Fox: The sufferings and acts of Shiloh-Jerusalem, a sequel to "The finding of Shiloh." London: Cecil Palmer, 1927.
Ronald Matthews: English Messiahs. London: Methuen, 1936
George Reginald Balleine: Past finding out, the tragic story of Joanna Southcott and her successors. London: S.P.C.K., 1956
Eugene Patrick Wright: A catalogue of the Joanna Southcott collection at the University of Texas. Austin: Univ. of Texas, 1968
Grayson, Emma: Had they had knowledge. New Plymouth, N.Z. 1974
Report on the papers of J. Southcott, 1750–1814, religious fanatic, and of her followers, 1801–1896. Middlesex Record Office 1040. London, 1975
John Duncan Martin Derrett: Nathaniel Brassey Halhed, his association with Joanna Southcott. Poona (India): B.O.R. Institute, 1979.
James K. Hopkins: A woman to deliver her people. Joanna Southcott and English millenarianism in an era of revolution. Austin: University of Texas Press, 1981 
John Duncan Martin: Prophecy in the Cotswolds 1803–1947. Joanna Southcott and spiritual reform. Shipston-on-Stour: P. I. Drinkwater on behalf of the Blockley Antiquarian Society, 1994
Val Lewis: Satan's mistress, the extraordinary story of the 18th century fanatic Joanna Southcott and her lifelong battle with the Devil. Shepperton: Nauticalia, 1997 
Susan Juster: Mystical pregnancy and holy bleeding, visionary experience in early modern Britain and America. In: William and Mary quarterly Vol. 57, No. 2 (2000) ISSN 0043-5597
Frances Brown: Joanna Southcott, the woman clothed with the sun. Cambridge: Lutterworth, 2002 
Frances Brown: Joanna Southcott's box of sealed prophecies. Cambridge: The Lutterworth Press, 2003 
Gordon Allan, "Joanna Southcott: Enacting the Woman Clothed with the Sun," Michael Lieb, Emma Mason and Jonathan Roberts, eds, The Oxford Handbook of the Reception History of the Bible (Oxford, OUP, 2011), 635–648

External links

The Panacea Society
Joanna Southcott's memorial stone
Archives relating to Joanna Southcott in the Harry Price papers

1750 births
1814 deaths
18th-century apocalypticists
19th-century apocalypticists
English religious leaders
People from East Devon District
Christian messianism
Founders of new religious movements
Prophets
Joanna